Terebra tricolor is a species of sea snail, a marine gastropod mollusk in the family Terebridae, the auger snails.

Description
The length of the shell attains 54.5 mm.

Distribution

References

 Terryn, Y. (2007). Terebridae: A Collectors Guide. Conchbooks & Natural Art. 59 pp + plates

External links
 Sowerby I, G. B. (1825). A catalogue of the shells contained in the collection of the late Earl of Tankerville: arranged according to the Lamarckian conchological system: together with an appendix, containing descriptions of many new species- London, vii + 92 + xxxiv pp
 Quoy, J. R. C. & Gaimard, J. P. (1832-1835). Voyage de la corvette l'Astrolabe : exécuté par ordre du roi, pendant les années 1826-1827-1828-1829, sous le commandement de M. J. Dumont d'Urville. Zoologie.
 Fedosov, A. E.; Malcolm, G.; Terryn, Y.; Gorson, J.; Modica, M. V.; Holford, M.; Puillandre, N. (2020). Phylogenetic classification of the family Terebridae (Neogastropoda: Conoidea). Journal of Molluscan Studies. 85(4): 359-388 

Terebridae
Gastropods described in 1825